Save Historic Newmarket is grassroots organisation based in Newmarket, Suffolk, with the stated aim of preserving the town as the global centre of the horseracing industry and the many thousands of jobs it provides, and as a potential World Heritage Site. It came to national attention as one of many groups opposed to the Hatchfield stud farm development.

Newmarket

Newmarket is generally regarded as the global centre of thoroughbred horse racing. It is one of two major business clusters in its region, the other being the Cambridge Science Park. The horse racing and breeding businesses provide over 8,500 jobs in the town alone. However, it has been noted that whilst being the leading employer, the racing industry in the town is fragile for a number of reasons, one being the difficulty of providing for the safe movement each day of the thousands of horses that are kept in Newmarket through the town to its training grounds.

Save Historic Newmarket began with small projects, including advising retailer Majestic Wine on a redesign of their new shop in the town, then in the planning stage. It is now one of the company's showcase shops.

The group supports development in the district area surrounding Newmarket, Suffolk, and has supported a number of towns in the district who wish to greatly increase their housing allocations. However, it also supports the view of major local businesses that the proposed use of Hatchfield farm for 1,200 houses would be disastrous for the town's small and major businesses and employees, partially owing to a congested and inflexible road system in the town and poor present means of movement for horses around the town. Over 3,000 horses live in Newmarket, and most need to use the training grounds on a daily basis.

Opposition to Hatchfield stud farm development

Save Historic Newmarket first came to national attention in 2009 by organising opposition to plans by Edward Stanley, 19th Earl of Derby to build on the land adjacent to his Staney House stud farm. The group and its affiliates have argued that the development represents a very poor cost-benefit bargain, as it threatens the town's future as a major economic, exporting and employment centre, whilst providing a residential development suited to nearby towns which have repeatedly requested more houses than they have been allocated in local plans.

The development has also been opposed by major local employers including the Jockey Club, Tattersalls, Godolphin racing, Darley Stud, and trainers Sir Michael Stoute, Henry Cecil, James Fanshawe, Luca Cumani, John Gosden, Clive Brittain, John Berry and many others. Senior managers of Godolphin Racing admitted that they could be forced to leave Newmarket if the development was approved. It is estimated that Godolphin and sister company Darley's departure from Newmarket would lead to the loss of at least 1,000 jobs.

On 2 June 2010, Forest Heath Planning Councillors unanimously rejected Lord Derby's plans on five separate grounds. This was the first such local decision following announcement of the abolition of Regional Spatial Strategies by Conservative Communities and Local Government Minister Eric Pickles. Edward Stanley, 19th Earl of Derby appealed the unanimous rejection of his plans. Local residents have said they had to raise up to £1 million to fight Lord Derby's appeal.

A group of local residents and businesses including Save Historic Newmarket then challenged the district council's planning strategy in the High Court, arguing it was flawed. On 25 March 2011, a Mr Justice Collins quashed the entire planning strategy related to Newmarket. The council and Lord Derby, who had joined them in opposing the local residents, were ordered to pay 90% of the groups' costs and refused leave to appeal.

Lord Derby's appeal proceeded throughout much of summer 2011, and was the subject of protests from local residents and businesses. On 23 March 2012, the Communities and Local Government Minister Eric Pickles, acting on the recommendation of the planning inspector, dismissed the appeal, a decision that Lord Derby did not accept.

Soon after, Lord Derby again applied for planning permission for the whole area, initially building 400 houses but marking the whole area for development. The plans were rejected by Newmarket Town Council, and all Newmarket's councillors on Forest Heath District Council. However, councillors for other towns voted for them, and they were approved by a majority decision. The Secretary of State immediately called the plans in, and a decision is expected in December 2015.

Opposition to the George Lambton Playing Fields development
The group has also opposed an application to replace the town's communal playing fields with a Sainsbury's supermarket. The application was refused.

References

External links
 Save Historic Newmarket
 Save Historic Newmarket on Facebook

Organisations based in Suffolk
Political advocacy groups in England
Newmarket, Suffolk